Southwest Independent School District is a public school district located in southwestern Bexar County, Texas, United States.

The district covers a  area that includes portions of the city of San Antonio and Von Ormy.

In 2009, the school district was rated "academically acceptable" by the Texas Education Agency.

Programs
In 2018 a program for aeronautical sciences for all grade levels debuted.

Schools

High school (Grades 9-12)
CAST STEM High School
Southwest High School
Southwest Legacy High School

Middle schools (Grades 6-8)
All four of SWISD's middle schools are named for astronauts aboard the Space Shuttle Challenger when it disintegrated after takeoff.

Christa McAuliffe - National Blue Ribbon School of Excellence in 1999-2000 
Ronald McNair
Francis Scobee
Judith A. Resnik

Elementary schools (Grades PK-5)
Big Country Elementary
Bob Hope Elementary
Elm Creek Elementary
Hidden Cove STEAM Academy
Indian Creek Elementary
Kriewald Road Elementary
Medio Creek Elementary
Sky Harbour Elementary
Southwest Elementary
Sun Valley Elementary
Spicewood Park Elementary

References

External links
Southwest ISD

School districts in Bexar County, Texas
School districts in San Antonio